Ruganzu II Ndoli was Mwami of the Kingdom of Rwanda since 1510 until death in 1543. He was the son of King Ndahiro II Cyamatare and Nyirangabo-ya-Nyantaba. Ruganzu II is the most renowned king of Rwanda. He was a great warrior and was alleged to have performed miracles. His life and reign pervade many legends in the
history of Rwanda. Is father, King Cyamatare and members of his family were brutally murdered by Nyebunga and his allies. Before his passing, the king planned and executed his son's escape plan.

The fall of King Ndahiro I Cyamatare occurred shortly after his son fled to the neighboring Kingdom of Karagwe. Having narrowly escaped death, the grieving prince found refuge in Karagwe under the tutelage of the Queen of Karagwe, who happened to be his aunt. Ruganzu Ndoli is said to have been raised by her Aunt in the Kingdom of Karagwe and his descendants include Ndoli Amani in Rwanda. Ruganzu, who is said to have left a mark on the Rwanda region, who is said to have returned in 1510 from the kingdom of Karagwe ka Bahinda, where he had been exiled with his aunt Nyabunyana and came to liberate Rwanda from the hands of foreigners after eleven years exile, young and inexperienced.

Ruganzu also assisted the King of Bugesera, Rwayitare, to attack and win the King of Burundi Ntare II Kibogora, whom they had disputes.

It is believed that he ascended the throne in 1510, Ruganzu also assisted the King of Bugesera, Rwayitare, to attack and win the ancestral King of Burundi Ntare II Kibogora, whom they had disputes. Ruganzu also strengthened bilateral relations between Rwanda and Karagwe, where his aunt was a queen who protected him and taught him to fight.

Finally,Ruganzu died 1543 from the shooting of an arrow in the eye when a man named Bitibibisi from Rusenyi (now Karongi).

References

16th-century monarchs in Africa
Rwandan kings
1543 deaths